Vũ Dân Tân (3 October 1946 in Hanoi – 14 October 2009) was a Vietnamese painter. He was the son of the playwright Vũ Đình Long (1896-1960). His Russian wife Natasha turned their Hanoi house into an open artists' salon and forum. He was one of three Vietnamese artists to participate in the Second Asia-Pacific Triennial of Contemporary Art at the Queensland Art Gallery from 27 September 1996 to 19 January 1997.

References

External links
The 2nd Asia Pacific Triennial of Contemporary Art

1946 births
2009 deaths
20th-century Vietnamese painters